The Chicago Aldermanic Black Caucus is a bloc of aldermen in the Chicago City Council, designed with the goal of "representing the needs and interests of Chicago's Black communities." During the 2019–23 term, the caucus consists of 20 members, out of the council's 50 aldermen.

Membership

Current members 
As of January 2020, the Caucus has 20 members.

Past members

Activity in City Council

2019–23 term 
In October 2019, the Black Caucus delayed a vote on a proposed ordinance authorizing legal cannabis dispensaries, expressing concerns that the ordinance would allow medical dispensaries to sell marijuana recreationally without a zoning change and that it did not have sufficient ownership requirements to enable minority business ownership. The ordinance passed despite the Caucus' opposition, although some Caucus members and Mayor Lightfoot did suggest that they would pursue amendments to the state cannabis law. After the city's first recreational dispensary license lottery, where only existing owners of medical dispensaries—who were all white—were eligible, the Black Caucus again proposed stalling sales in order to achieve the state law's social equity goals. In December 2019, Caucus chair Ervin and other members threatened to force a vote on an ordinance to stall sales until July 1 (six months after the originally scheduled date of January 1) in order to demand a minority ownership stake in the market. Such a vote to delay sales was held but failed to pass on December 18 in a 19–29 vote, with six members of the Black Caucus splitting to vote against the measure.

See also 
 Chicago City Council Democratic Socialist Caucus
 Chicago City Council Latino Caucus
 Chicago City Council LGBT Caucus
 Chicago City Council Progressive Reform Caucus

References 

Issue-based groups of legislators
Caucuses of the Chicago City Council